Events from the year 1832 in Germany.

Incumbents
 King of Bavaria – Ludwig I of Bavaria
 King of Prussia – Frederick William III of Prussia
 King of Saxony – Anthony of Saxony
 King of Württemberg – William I of Württemberg
 Grand Duke of Baden – Leopold, Grand Duke of Baden

Events
 30 May – The Hambacher Fest, a demonstration for civil liberties and national unity, ends with no result.
 15 December – The CGS system goes back to a proposal in 1832 by the German mathematician Carl Friedrich Gauss to base a system of absolute units on the three fundamental units of length.

Undated
 The first Baedeker guidebook, Voyage du Rhin de Mayence à Cologne, is published in Koblenz.
 Publication begins (posthumously) of Carl von Clausewitz's Vom Kriege ("On War").
 Weimar Classicism ends with death of Johann Wolfgang von Goethe
 Work Faust, Part Two by Johann Wolfgang von Goethe published.
 Work Maler Nolten by Eduard Mörike is published.
 Song Ihr Kinderlein, kommet by Christoph von Schmid is published.
 Opera ''Die Hochzeit by Richard Wagner
 Symphony in C major by Richard Wagner
 String Quintet No. 1 b by Felix Mendelssohn revised

Births
 21 January – Carl Hubert von Wendt, German politician (died 1903)
 24 January – Albert Arnz, German painter (died 1914)
 25 January – Paul Bronsart von Schellendorff, Prussian general (died 1891)
 28 January – Franz Wüllner, German composer (died 1902)
 29 January – Wilhelm Böckmann, German architect (died 1902)
 30 January – Karl von Thielen, German politician (died 1906)
 13 February – Wilhelm Müller, German pathologe, (died 1909)
 21 February – Louis Maurer, German American lithographer (died 1932)
 10 March – Heinrich Bellermann, German music theorist (died 1903)
 4 April – Fedor Flinzer, German writer (died 1911)
 8 April – Alfred von Waldersee, German fieldmarshall (died 1904)
 15 April – Wilhelm Busch, German humorist, poet, illustrator and painter (died 1908)
 7 May – Heinrich Julius Holtzmann, German protestant theologian (died 1910)
 12 May – Carl von Perbandt, German landscape painter (died 1911)
 14 May – Rudolf Lipschitz, German mathematician (died 1903)
 18 May – Heinrich XIV, Prince Reuss Younger Line (died 1913)
 10 June – Nicolaus Otto, German engineer (died 1891)
 1 July – Karl Binz, German pharmacologist (died 1913)
 19 July – Julius von Verdy du Vernois, German general (died 1910)
 7 August – Max Lange, German writer, publisher and chess player (died 1899)
 8 August – George, King of Saxony (died 1904)
 9 August – Alexander von Monts, German officer (died 1889)
 16 August – Wilhelm Wundt, German physiologist and psychologist (died 1920)
 1 September – Hermann Steudner, German botanist (died 1863)
 2 October – Julius von Sachs, German botanist (died 1897)
 6 October:
 August Eisenlohr, German egyptologist (died 1902)
 Christian Mali, German painter and art professor (died 1906)
 21 October – Gustav Langenscheidt, German publisher (died 1895)
 22 October – Robert Eitner, German musicologist, researcher and bibliographer (died 1905)
 24 September – Gustav Frank, German theologian (died 1904)
 9 November – Adele Spitzeder, German actress and folk singer (died 1895)
 15 November – Hermann Ottomar Herzog, German American landscape painter (died 1932)
 18 November – John Gottlieb Auer, German Anglican bishop (died 1874)
 12 December – Adolf von Arnim-Boitzenburg, German politician (died 1887)
 16 December – Wilhelm Julius Foerster, German astronomer (died 1921)

Deaths 
 17 January – August Friedrich Ferdinand von der Goltz, German politician (born 1765)
 15 February – Hardenack Otto Conrad Zinck, German-Danish composer (born 1746)
 23 February – Wolf Heidenheim, German exegete (born 1757)
 12 March – Friedrich Kuhlau, German Danish composer (born 1786)
 22 March – Johann Wolfgang von Goethe, German writer (born 1749)
 28 March – Lazarus Bendavid, German mathematician and philosopher (born 1762)
 30 March – Dora Stock, German portrait painter (born 1760)
 15 April – Adam Eberle, German painter (born 1804)
 21 April – Karl Wilhelm Ferdinand Unzelmann, German actor and opera singer (born 1753)
 24 April – Friedrich Gottlob Hayne, German botanist and taxonomist (born 1763)
 7 May – Christian Gottfried Schütz, German classical scholar and humanist (born 1747)
 15 May – Carl Friedrich Zelter, German composer (born 1758)
 20 May – Johann Birnbaum, German jurist (born 1763)
 9 June – Friedrich von Gentz, German diplomat and writer (born 1764)
 21 June – Princess Amalie of Hesse-Darmstadt (born 1754)
 19 July – Karl Julius Weber, German writer (born 1767)
 23 August – Johann Georg Wagler, German herpetologist and ornithologist (born 1800)
 27 September – Karl Christian Friedrich Krause, German philosopher (born 1781)
 1 November – Julius von Voss, German writer (born 1768)
 8 November – Karl August von Beckers zu Westerstetten, Bavarian general (born 1770)
 29 November – Karl Rudolphi, German-Swedish biologist and naturalist (born 1771)
 29 December – Johann Friedrich Cotta, German publisher (born 1764)

References 

 
Years of the 19th century in Germany
Germany
Germany